Atypical is an American comedy-drama television series created by Robia Rashid for Netflix. It focuses on the life of 18-year-old Samuel(Sam) Gardner (Keir Gilchrist), who is on the autism spectrum. The first season was released on August 11, 2017, consisting of eight episodes. The 10-episode second season was released on September 7, 2018. In October 2018, the series was renewed for a third season of ten episodes, which was released on November 1, 2019. In February 2020, it was renewed for a fourth and final season, which premiered on July 9, 2021.

The first season received mostly positive reviews. However, it was highly criticized by some sources for its lack of autistic actors, and inaccuracies in its depiction of autism. The second season featured autistic actors and writers, giving them an opportunity to work and represent their community, and received mostly positive reviews. The third season continued this positive development and received overwhelmingly positive reviews.

Cast and characters

Main

 Keir Gilchrist as Sam Gardner, an 18-year-old young man on the autism spectrum who has an interest in Antarctica and loves penguins. Gilchrist said about the character, "He's one person that is on the autism spectrum. He's a very specific character."
 Jennifer Jason Leigh as Elsa Gardner, Sam and Casey's overprotective mother.

 Brigette Lundy-Paine as Casey Gardner, Sam's younger sister who also is very protective of him. She is very athletic and thanks to this gets a scholarship at a private school.
 Amy Okuda as Julia Sasaki (seasons 1–2; recurring: season 3; guest: season 4), Sam's dedicated therapist, whom he briefly has a crush on.
 Michael Rapaport as Doug Gardner, Sam and Casey's father and Elsa's husband. He works as an emergency medical technician (EMT).

Recurring
 Nik Dodani as Zahid Raja, Sam's best friend, a "dweeby and foul-mouthed lothario"
 Jenna Boyd as Paige Hardaway, Sam's high-achieving friend and later girlfriend.
 Graham Rogers as Evan Chapin, Casey's boyfriend from the beginning of the series. At the end of season 3, they however split up as Casey realizes she is bisexual. He works at a local pizza place, but later decides to become an EMT like Doug.
 Christina Offley as Sharice (seasons 1–2 & 4; guest: season 3), Casey's childhood best friend.
 Kevin Daniels as Coach Briggs
 Rachel Redleaf as Beth Chapin, Evan's sister, who Casey stands up for after witnessing her get bullied for her weight.
 Ariela Barer as Bailey Bennett (seasons 1–2)
 Anthony Jacques as Christopher (seasons 1–2)
 Wendy Braun as Kathy
 Karl T. Wright as Chuck (seasons 1 & 3–4), Doug's EMT partner
 Raúl Castillo as Nick (season 1; guest: season 2), a bartender Elsa has an affair with and one of her friends
 Nina Ameri as Luisa, Elsa's friend.
 Fivel Stewart as Izzie Taylor (seasons 2–4), a student at Casey's new school. A fellow runner, she becomes Casey's best friend, and later, girlfriend.
 Kimmy Gatewood as Coach Crowley (seasons 2–4)
 Angel Laketa Moore as Megan (seasons 2–4), Doug's female friend & confidante from the Autism support group.
 Domonique Brown as Jasper (seasons 2–4) a student in the peer group who later enrolls at Denton.
 Layla Weiner as Amber (seasons 2–3), Megan's daughter.
 Naomi Rubin as Noelle (seasons 2–4), a girl in Sam's peer group who later attends Denton with Jasper and Sid.
 Graham Phillips as Nate (season 2; guest: season 3), Izzie's ex-boyfriend.
 Casey Wilson as Ms. Whitaker (season 2)
 Major Curda as Arlo (season 2; guest: season 1)
 Jeff Rosenthal as Bob (seasons 3–4; guest: seasons 1–2), Sam and Zahid's boss at Techtropolis.
 Sara Gilbert as Professor Judd (seasons 3–4), Sam's ethics professor at Denton University.
 Allie Rae Treharne as Gretchen (seasons 3–4), Zahid's disgraced troublemaking girlfriend.
 Kimia Behpoornia as Abby (seasons 3–4), Sam's friend.
 Eric McCormack as Professor Shinerock (season 3), Sam's art professor at Denton University.
 Tal Anderson as Sid (seasons 3–4) a new friend that Sam meets while she is volunteering at the Denton Disability Services office.
 Jenny O'Hara as Lillian (seasons 3–4), Elsa's mother.

Episodes

Series overview

Season 1 (2017)

Season 2 (2018)

Season 3 (2019)

Season 4 (2021)

Background, production, and release
The coming-of-age series, originally known as Antarctica, was created and written by Robia Rashid, who previously worked on How I Met Your Mother and The Goldbergs as a producer. For a more accurate portrayal, she consulted with Michelle Dean, a California State University professor who worked at UCLA's Center for Autism Research and Treatment. Gilchrist said in an interview for Vulture, "[Rashid] wrote the script. We talked a ton and I did research and I watched movies and I read books". The supporting character Christopher is played by Anthony Jacques, who is autistic.

Season 1 was released on August 11, 2017, and consisted of eight episodes. On September 13, 2017, Atypical was renewed for a ten-episode second season. David Finch, who is autistic, joined the writing team. Eight autistic actors from The Miracle Project have supporting roles in the second season as members of a peer support group which Sam joins, and other autistic actors play neurotypical characters. Executive producer Mary Rohlich also said the show was "bringing in more female directors and female diversity": seven of the ten episodes were directed by women and half of the writing team were female.

The second season was released on September 7, 2018, and consisted of 10 episodes. On October 24, 2018, Atypical was renewed for a third season of 10 episodes. In May 2019, it was announced Eric McCormack and Sara Gilbert would appear in the third season. The third season was released on November 1, 2019, and consisted of 10 episodes. On February 24, 2020, Atypical was renewed for its fourth and last season. The season consisted of ten episodes and premiered on July 9, 2021.

Reception

Season 1
At the review aggregator Metacritic, the first season received a score of 66 from 20 reviews, indicating "generally favorable reviews". On Rotten Tomatoes, 74% of 42 critics have given the season a positive review with an average rating of 5.4 out of 10. The website's consensus is: "Great performances and a likable, realistic family dealing with autism lift Atypical above its alarming tonal shifts and predictability." The acting was generally well-received, although Gilchrist's portrayal received criticism for being "inaccurate" and "stereotypical". The lack of autistic people in the cast was also questioned.

Season 2
Sara Luterman of The New York Times wrote that the second season improves on the first. Sam's decision to go to art school deviates from common depictions of autism, and his being autistic is no longer "the source of [his family's] misery". Luterman praised the involvement of more autistic people as writers and actors, but criticized that Sam's misogyny is unaddressed and that he is "still portrayed as more of a checklist than a person". Lorraine Ali of the Los Angeles Times lauded the show's continuing "unique perspective, sharp humor and empathy", and described the show as a "wonderfully atypical family drama" with "many moving and awkward moments".

In a negative review, Jen Chaney of Vulture wrote that the show "loses some of its focus" in the second season, such as with the "unnecessary side plot" of Julia, an "underdeveloped side character", or by attempting to make Zahid a "lovably wacky sidekick". Chaney stated that the show's situations "often seem contrived or aim blatantly for the easy joke", and criticized scenes between Doug and Elsa which "don't seem reflective of actual human behavior". However, Chaney praised Lundy-Paine's acting, which switches between "understanding" and "exasperation", and Gilchrist's "yard-stick straight" acting.

Season 3 
On Rotten Tomatoes, season 3 has a 100% rating based on 7 reviews, and the average rating is 7/10. Merrill Barr of Forbes wrote, "Season three of Atypical is the show's boldest to date and truly feels like it has reached its stride. [...] Now, the show just gets to live and breathe as it explores its unique story in ever-evolving and fascinating ways." Holly Edwards of Film Inquiry concluded that "the dramatic and comedic beats almost always hit the right notes and know when a shift in tone is required." She called the show a "step up from many shows of the same variety and a worthwhile viewing experience."

Season 4 
Lorraine Ali of the Los Angeles Times wrote that the final season of Atypical "deftly tackles" the fears parents of atypical children may have when watching their son or daughter come of age. She also noted the season "cement[ed] the show's legacy as one of the best series to deal with autism and its butterfly effect on family, friends, and loved ones".

Accolades

See also
 Autism friendly
 Autism rights movement
 Autism spectrum disorders in the media

References

External links
 
 
 

2010s American black comedy television series
2010s American comedy-drama television series
2010s American LGBT-related comedy television series
2010s American LGBT-related drama television series
2010s American teen drama television series
2020s American black comedy television series
2020s American comedy-drama television series
2020s American LGBT-related comedy television series
2020s American LGBT-related drama television series
2020s American teen drama television series
2017 American television series debuts
2021 American television series endings
Autism in television
Coming-of-age television shows
Fiction about diseases and disorders
Sam Gardner|
English-language Netflix original programming
Television series about dysfunctional families
Television series about teenagers
Television series by Sony Pictures Television
Television shows set in Connecticut
Works about higher education
Bisexuality-related television series